Pennant was a station on the Port Authority of Allegheny County's light rail network, located in the Beechview neighborhood of Pittsburgh, Pennsylvania. The street level stop was located in an especially hilly portion of a neighborhood known for its rolling terrain, and providing access to commuters within walking distance.

On February 2, 2021, Port Authority announced in a news release that Pennant station would close permanently, due to deteriorating pedestrian infrastructure and low ridership. According to the release, the stairs connecting Pennant station to Platt Avenue were found to be in poor condition in a routine inspection in fall 2020, and in another recent inspection, Port Authority engineers found further deterioration. The permanent closure went into effect on Monday, February 15, 2021.

References

External links 

Port Authority T Stations Listings
Port Authority to Shutter Pennant Station

Port Authority of Allegheny County stations
Railway stations in the United States opened in 1987
Railway stations closed in 2021
Former Port Authority of Allegheny County stations